Kelheim is a Landkreis (district) in Bavaria, Germany, bound (from the north and clockwise) by the regions Regensburg, Landshut, Freising, Pfaffenhofen, Eichstätt and Neumarkt.

Geography

The district is located halfway between Ingolstadt and Regensburg on both banks of the Danube. In the northwestern part it includes a part of the Altmühl Valley Nature Park and the confluence of Altmühl and Danube.

Coat of arms
The coat of arms displays:
the blue and white checked pattern of Bavaria
the roses symbolise the monasteries of Biburg and Weltenburg
silver and black are the colours of Abensberg, which once was a free imperial city

Towns and municipalities

References

External links

Official website (German)
Altmühltal Nature Park (German, English)

 
Districts of Bavaria